Michael Nardone (born 20 January 1967) is a Scottish actor. He was raised in Ballingry, Fife and trained in Drama at Queen Margaret University in Edinburgh.

He starred as Mascius in the BBC/HBO/RAI TV series Rome and appeared as DCI Richard Whiteside in BBC Scotland drama River City.

His many stage credits include Macbeth and King Lear for the Royal National Theatre and Stitchers by Esther Freud at the Jermyn Street Theatre alongside Sinéad Cusack.

Selected filmography
 Soft Top Hard Shoulder (1992) – Stevie
 Being Human (1994) – Raider
 Wycliffe (1996, TV Series) – PC Joe Duggan
 The Bill (1998-2008, TV Series) – Gordon McCardle / Everett / Jeremy Dyson
 The Match (1999) – Dingus
 The Miracle Maker (2000) – (voice)
 Silent Witness (2002, TV Series) – PC Shaun Nicholson
 Dot the I (2003) – Detective 2
 Steel River Blues (2004, TV Series) – Dave Tanner
 Rome (2005–2007, TV Series) – Mascius
 Skins (2008, TV Series) – Sandy Jenkins
 Merlin (2009, TV Series) – Kendrick
 Jinx (2009, TV Series) – Mike / Mr Peckgrind
 Durham County (2010, TV Series) – Ivan Sujic
 Ben Hur (2010, TV Mini-Series) – Hortator
 Combat Kids (2010, TV Series) – Steve
 Mercenaries (2011) – Radovic
 Intruders (2011) – Frank
 The Somnambulists (2011) – Man 3
 The Field of Blood (2013, TV Series) – DI Michael Gallagher
 Wayland's Song (2013) – Wayland
Line of Duty (2014, TV Series) – O'Neill
 Shetland (2014, TV series) – Donnie Tulloch 
 National Theatre Live: King Lear (2014) – The Duke of Cornwall
 Child 44 (2015) – Semyon Okun
 The Night Manager (2016, TV Mini-Series) – Frisky
 Whisky Galore! (2016) – Brown
 Rogue One (2016) – Shield Gate Officer
 Clique (2018, TV Series) – Alec McStay
 Traces (2019, TV Series) – DI Neil McKinven

References

External links

1966 births
Living people
People from Ballingry
Scottish male television actors
Scottish male film actors
Alumni of Queen Margaret University